Jan Looten (1617–18 in Amsterdam – c. 1681 in United Kingdom) was a Dutch landscape painter. He is first recorded in Amsterdam at his wedding with Catelijntje Harmans in September 1643, as a 25-year old painter from Amsterdam, son of Laurens Jansz Loten. In or after 1664 he moved to London and later to York. Samuel Pepys reportedly visited his studio in 1669 and was "unimpressed" with his work and was recommended to Simon Verelst, who he saw more favourably.

He taught the painter and draftsman Jan Griffier.

Four landscapes attributed to Jan Looten are in the Royal Collection, two of which were painted in circa 1675 for King James II of England.

References

External links

1618 births
1681 deaths
Painters from Amsterdam
Dutch Golden Age painters
Dutch male painters
Dutch landscape painters
Dutch expatriates in England